Brittany Ashworth is an English actress. She is known for playing Alex Ratcliffe in the 2014 film Mrs Ratcliffe's Revolution. She starred as Juliette in the 2017 apocalyptic thriller film , and as Kelly in the 2022 direct-to-video film The Ledge.

Career
Ashworth starred in Mrs Ratcliffe's Revolution and Mobile before studying English Literature at the University of Oxford.

After graduating, Ashworth played Sister Vaduva in the 2017 film The Crucifixion opposite Sophie Cookson, before playing the lead role of Juliet in the apocalyptic thriller film . She played Fran Adams in the 2018 British comedy film, Accident Man, and was cast in Guy Ritchie's 2019 film The Gentlemen. In 2022, Ashworth starred as mountain climber Kelly, in the direct-to-video film thriller The Ledge.

Filmography

Film

Television

References

External links
 

21st-century English actresses
Alumni of the University of Oxford
British film actresses
British stage actresses
British television actresses
Living people
Year of birth missing (living people)